The 2007 Superstars Series season was the fourth season of the Campionato Italiano Superstars (Italian Superstars Championship) and the inaugural season of the International Superstars Series.
The Italian championship was won by Gianni Morbidelli driving for Audi, while the international series was won by Giuliano Alessi driving for BMW.

Teams and drivers

Audi Sport Italia and its drivers entered only the Italian Championship.

Calendar

Scoring system

Results

Championship standings

Campionato Italiano Superstars – Drivers

International Superstars Series – Drivers

International Superstars Series – Teams

External links
Official Superstars website

Superstars Series
Superstars Series seasons